Tres Hombres (English: Three Men) is the third studio album by the American rock band ZZ Top. It was released by London Records in July 1973 and was the band's first collaboration with engineer Terry Manning. It was the band's commercial breakthrough; in the US, the album entered the top ten while the single "La Grange" reached number 41 on the Billboard Hot 100.

Recording and production 

The track "Waitin' for the Bus" segues into "Jesus Just Left Chicago" almost seamlessly. Houston Chronicle entertainment writer Andrew Dansby wrote in 2013 that this fusing of the songs was not the original plan. Dansby claimed that the album's engineer was splicing tape and cut too much, leaving no gap between the songs. The album's engineer Terry Manning, who performed the edit, counter-claimed in a 2017 blog post that it was no accident. Manning admitted that although it was not planned beforehand, as an engineer he was "... always looking very carefully at the timings between songs ... counting time, feeling how different time sigs (signatures) go together, different keys, different feels ..." Manning wrote that he, "... tried several things to see how those two (songs) would go together" when it dawned on him that they could "... come together as one song, exactly as if played that way." Manning wrote that when he initially presented the edit, Billy Gibbons loved it but the album's producer Bill Ham was confused and wary of it, "... but after several plays, it was obvious (to) everyone that there was no other way they could ever exist again."

Release 
The album was released in July 1973. Frontman Billy Gibbons said in 2013:

We could tell that we had something special. The record became quite the turning point for us. The success was handwriting on the wall, because from that point we became honorary citizens of Memphis.

At the height of ZZ Top's success in the mid-1980s, a digitally remixed version of the recording was released on CD and the original 1973 mix was no longer issued. The remix version created controversy among fans because it significantly changed the sound of the instruments, especially drums. The remix version was used on all early CD copies and was the only version available for over 20 years. A remastered and expanded edition of the album was released on February 28, 2006, which contains three bonus live tracks. The 2006 edition is the first CD version to use Manning's original 1973 mix. Subsequent releases on digital platforms such as iTunes have used the original mix as well.

In addition to the standard 2-channel stereo version, a four-channel quadraphonic version was also released in 1973 in the Quad 8 8-track tape and Q4 reel-to-reel formats.

The only single released from the album in most countries was "La Grange" (backed with "Just Got Paid" from the band's second album Rio Grande Mud), which peaked at number 41 on the Billboard Hot 100 in June 1974.

Reception 

The album was released to a lukewarm reception. Steve Apple in a September 1973 review for Rolling Stone felt that while the "Southern rock & roll sound" was becoming popular, ZZ Top themselves were "only one of several competent Southern rocking bands", though they had "an advantage over most white rockers" because they "sound black". He felt that ZZ Top had "the dynamic rhythms that only the finest of the three-piece bands can cook up. Billy Gibbons plays a tasty Duane Allman lead with Dusty Hill and Frank Beard pounding out the funky bottom", and were "one of the most inventive of the three-piece rockers" but wondered when "audiences will get tired of hearing the same ... 'Poot yawl hans together' patter." The album peaked at number 8 on the Billboard 200.

In 2000, the album was voted number 501 in Colin Larkin's All Time Top 1000 Albums. In 2003, it was ranked number 498 on Rolling Stone magazine's list of the 500 greatest albums of all time, and in 2012 ranked at number 490 on a revised list. In 2011 Houston Press named it the best boogie rock album ever in its list of "Five Essential Boogie-Rock Albums". In July 2013, 40 years after its release, the album was described by Andrew Dansby in the Houston Chronicle as "... full of characters and doings so steeped in caricature – yet presented straight-faced – as to invite skepticism. The album is stuffed with color and flavor, much like its famous gate-fold photo on the inside: a gut-busting couple of plates of food from the much-beloved but now-closed Leo's Mexican Restaurant on South Shepherd near Westheimer." AllMusic commented that "Tres Hombres is the record that brought ZZ Top their first top ten record, making them stars in the process. It couldn't have happened to a better record", and rated it 4.5 out of 5 stars. Andy Beta of Pitchfork awarded the album 9.0 out of 10, writing in 2017 that, "ZZ Top's 1973 breakthrough was a masterful melding of complementary styles, cramming Southern rock and blues boogie through the band's own idiosyncratic filter."

Legacy 
The song "Beer Drinkers & Hell Raisers" was covered by British rock band Motörhead on their 1977 EP of the same name. "Jesus Just Left Chicago" has been performed 81 times in concert by American jam band Phish since 1987, and their version of the song appeared on their 1997 live album Slip Stitch and Pass and four volumes of their Live Phish archival concert series.

Track listing

Personnel 
ZZ Top
Billy Gibbons – guitar, vocals, harmonica on "Waitin' for the Bus"
Dusty Hill – bass, vocals
Frank Beard – drums, percussion (credited as "Rube Beard")

Production
Bill Ham – production
Robin Brian – engineering (Brian Studios)
Terry Manning – engineering, mixing, editing (Ardent Studios)
Bill Narum – album cover design
Galen Scott – photography

Charts

Certifications

References

External links

ZZ Top albums
London Records albums
1973 albums
Albums produced by Bill Ham